Derrick Lythgoe (5 May 1933 – 30 December 2012) was an English footballer who played in the Football League for Blackpool, Bristol City and Norwich City. He scored twice in the 1962 Football League Cup Final.

References

External links
 Derrick Lythgoe stats at Neil Brown stat site

English footballers
English Football League players
1933 births
2012 deaths
Footballers from Bolton
Blackpool F.C. players
Norwich City F.C. players
Bristol City F.C. players
King's Lynn F.C. players
Association football forwards